Phunderdihari is a census town in Surguja district in the Indian state of Chhattisgarh.

Demographics
 India census, Phunderdihari had a population of 16,106. Males constitute 51% of the population and females 49%. Phunderdihari has an average literacy rate of 77%, higher than the national average of 59.5%: male literacy is 82%, and female literacy is 72%. In Phunderdihari, 12% of the population is under 6 years of age.

References

Cities and towns in Surguja district